Karl August Genzken (June 8, 1885 – October 10, 1957) was a Nazi physician who conducted human experiments on prisoners of several concentration camps. He was a Gruppenführer (Major General) of the Waffen-SS and the Chief of the Medical Office of the Waffen-SS. Genzken was tried as a war criminal in the Doctors' Trial at Nuremberg.

Military career
Genzken had joined the NSDAP on July 7, 1926 (party member No. 39,913). He joined the SS on November 5, 1933 (No. 207,954).

In 1934, he was reactivated as a reserve officer in the Naval Medical Service. After that, he transferred to the SS Operational Main Office then was promoted from an assistant medical director to the medical superintendent of the SS Hospital in Berlin, and appointed Chief of the Medical Office of the Waffen-SS in 1942. He rose to the rank of Major General in the Waffen-SS.

Genzken was involved in a series of human experiments that were carried out on prisoners of several concentration camps. Genzken was accused and convicted of involvement in the typhus experiments conducted from December 1941 - February 1945, which were conducted for the benefit of the German armed forces to test the effectiveness of vaccines against typhus, smallpox, cholera, and other diseases. The experiments were conducted at Buchenwald and Natzweiler. Genzken was also accused of involvement in sulfanilamide experiments, poison experiments, and incendiary bomb experiments but was not convicted on these counts.

Trial and conviction
Genzken was found guilty of war crimes, crimes against humanity, and membership in an illegal organization by the American Military Tribunal No. I. He was condemned in August 1947 to life imprisonment by the tribunal. His sentence was later reduced to 20 years and he was released in April 1954.

See also 
Concentration Camps Inspectorate
Doctors' Trial
List SS-Gruppenführer
Nazi human experimentation

References

 OCLC's Authority records for 20070228

1885 births
1957 deaths
People from Preetz
People convicted by the United States Nuremberg Military Tribunals
Physicians in the Nazi Party
SS-Gruppenführer
German people convicted of crimes against humanity
German prisoners sentenced to life imprisonment
Prisoners sentenced to life imprisonment by the United States military
Nazi human subject research
People from the Province of Schleswig-Holstein
Waffen-SS personnel